The 2011–12 TFF Third League (also known as Spor-Toto Third League due to sponsorship reasons) is the 11th season of the league since its establishment in 2001 as the fourth level division; and the 41st season of the third league in Turkish football since its establishment in 1967–68 (before 2001 league was played as third level division). The start date of the league is 28 August 2011 and end date is 13 May 2012.

League was started with 54 teams in three groups: Groups 1, 2 and 3, each consisting 18. Winner of each group will promote to 2012–13 TFF Second League. A playoff series will be played among the best four teams in each group to determine the three more teams to promote. Bottom three teams in each groups will relegate to 2012–13 Regional Amateur League.

Teams

Team summaries

Note: Last updated on 11 September 2011 from TFF official website.

Group 1

Group 1 league table

Group 1 positions by round

Group 1 results

Group 1 top goalscorers
Including matches played on 9 August 2011;Source: TFF Third League page

Group 2

Group 2 league table

Group 2 positions by round

Group 2 results

Group 2 top goalscorers
Including matches played on 9 August 2011;Source: TFF Third League page

Group 3

Group 3 league table

Group 3 positions by round

Group 3 results

Group 3 top goalscorers
Including matches played on 9 August 2011;Source: TFF Third League page

Promotion playoffs
In each group, teams ranked second through fifth compete in the promotion playoffs for the 2012–13 TFF Second League. The 2nd team and 5th team, and 3rd and 4th teams play one match in a neutral venue. Winners play finals. Winner of the final becomes the second team in each group to promote to TFF Second League 2012-2013.

References

See also
 2011–12 Turkish Cup
 2011–12 Süper Lig
 2011–12 TFF First League
 2011–12 TFF Second League

4
Turk
2011-12